Whitaker House is a  Christian publishing house in New Kensington, Pennsylvania, near Pittsburgh. It was founded by Robert E. Whitaker, Sr.  Upon his death in 2012, his son Robert Whitaker Jr. became president.

Their stated mission is "To advance God's kingdom by providing biblically based products that proclaim the power of the gospel and minister to the spiritual needs of people around the world."

The distribution arm of the business is called Anchor Distributors.

In 2018, Whitaker House's parent company, Whitaker Corporation, acquired the children's book publisher Smart Kidz Books.

References

External links
Whitaker House Web site
Anchor Distributors Web site

Book publishing companies based in Pennsylvania
Christian mass media companies
Christian publishing companies
Publishing companies established in 1970
1970 establishments in Pennsylvania
Companies based in Westmoreland County, Pennsylvania